Legislative Assembly elections were held in the Indian state of West Bengal in 1971. The assembly election was held alongside the 1971 Indian general election.

Parties and coalitions
Ahead of the 1971 election the map of party coalitions was redrawn. The United Front had split into two after the resignation of its Chief Minister. The United Left Front, also known as the Six-Party Coalition, was led by the Communist Party of India (Marxist) and included the Revolutionary Communist Party of India (Sudhindranath Kumar group), the Biplobi Bangla Congress, the Bolshevik Party of India (Nepal Bhattacharya group), the Workers Party of India and the Marxist Forward Bloc.

The United Left Democratic Front, also known as the Eight-Party Coalition, was led by the Communist Party of India and included the All India Forward Bloc, the Socialist Unity Centre of India, the All India Gorkha League, the Bolshevik Party of India (Barada Mukutmoni group), the RCPI (Anadi Das group), the Samyukta Socialist Party and the Praja Socialist Party (Rebel). The ULDF failed to reach a seat-sharing agreement with the Bangla Congress, but managed to agree to some seat-sharings with the Congress(R).

The Bangla Congress courted the Congress(R) for a seat-sharing alliance, but the Congress(R) rejected the offer. For Congress(R) the Bangla Congress was considered too close to Congress(O).

Violence
The electoral campaign was marred by violent incidents. The Communist Party of India (Marxist-Leninist) called for electoral boycott. The CPI(M) on the other hand saw the CPI(ML) as a pawn of Congress(R) to sabotage its chances of winning power in the state. Across the state CPI(M) and CPI(ML) confronted each other; CPI(M) claimed that the CPI(ML) had killed some 200 of its cadres.

Three candidates were killed during the electoral campaign; on February 17, 1971 Debdatta Mondal (Bangla Congress candidate in Ukhra) was killed, on February 20, 1971 the All India Forward Bloc leader and Shyampukur constituency candidate Hemanta Kumar Basu was killed in broad daylight and on March 5, 1971 Pijush Chandra Ghosh (Congress(O) candidate in Dum Dum) was killed. Elections were countermanded in these three constituencies, but in Shyampukur no election was held as Ajit Kumar Biswas (the candidate nominated by the Forward Bloc in lieu of Hemanta Kumar Basu) was killed as well.

Result by constituency

Outcome
Following the election, the Congress(R), the Bangla Congress and the ULDF came to an agreement (albeit without the approval of SUCI), that Congress(R) and Bangla Congress would form a government and ULDF would support it from outside. Two ULDF affiliates, SSP and Gorkha League, joined the government.

References

West Bengal
State Assembly elections in West Bengal
1970s in West Bengal